Kaera is a Papuan language spoken on the northeastern coast of Pantar island in the Alor archipelago of Indonesia. It belongs to the Timor-Alor-Pantar language family. Kaera is used alongside Indonesian in religious contexts, but not used in education.

Phonology
All the information in this section is from Klamer's sketch grammar.

Consonants

Vowels

References

External links
Kaera Abangiwang Collection at The Language Archive

Alor–Pantar languages
Articles citing ISO change requests
Languages of Indonesia